Abdul Bari Firangi Mahali  (1878–1926) was an Indian Muslim scholar and writer from the Firangi Mahal palace in Lucknow. He authored 111 books.

History
His descendants moved from Sihali, Barabanki to the Firangi Mahal around 1692. In 1915, he was residing in Lucknow.

Politics

During the First World War he asked the Sultan of Turkey to support Britain or remain out of the war.

On 26 January 1919 he presided over a protest meeting in Lucknow against the British attitude against Muslims.

He was highly active in the Khilafat movement.

He preached Hindu-Muslim unity, especially during the Khilafat agitation, and was an associate of Mahatma Gandhi. On other occasions, he urged Muslims not to sacrifice cows in respect of the Hindus.

Institutions

 In his opposition to Western education, he founded Madarssa-i-Nizamia in Lucknow.
 He set up Anjuman-i-Khuddam-i-Kabba (1914) to prevent desecration of Muslim Holy places by the British.
 He was the founder member of Darul Mussannefin Shibli Academy, (1915–1916).
 He was the founder member of Jamia Millia Islamia in United Provinces, India (1920).

See also
Ansari (nesbat)
Islam in India

References

External links
 Pan-Islam in British Indian politics: a study of the Khilafat Movement, 1918 By M. Naeem Qureshi

1878 births
1926 deaths
Scholars from Lucknow
20th-century Indian Muslims
Muslim writers
Founders of Indian schools and colleges
Indian independence activists from Uttar Pradesh
20th-century Indian scholars
Founders of Jamiat Ulama-e-Hind